Waldhere, Wealdhere or Waldere can refer to:

 Waldere, Old English epic poem surviving only in fragments
 Waldhere (Bishop of London), early 8th-century bishop of London

Old English given names